Francesco Ange (1675–1757) was an Italian painter of the late-Baroque period. Born in Annesi and trained in Bologna. He joined the Philippine order established by Saint Phillip Neri.

References

1675 births
1757 deaths
17th-century Italian painters
Italian male painters
18th-century Italian painters
Painters from Bologna
Italian Baroque painters
18th-century Italian male artists